Baher Abdulhai is a Canadian civil engineer, academic, entrepreneur, and researcher. He is a Professor in the Department of Civil Engineering, Director of Intelligent Transportation Systems Centre, and Co-Director of iCity Centre for Automated and Transformative Transportation at the University of Toronto. He is also the CEO and managing director of IntelliCAN Transportation System Inc.

Abdulhai's work focuses on exploring the aspects of modeling and simulation of large-scale dynamic transportation networks, Artificial Intelligence (AI) based street and freeway traffic control, traveler information systems, and emergency evacuation optimization. 

Abdulhai was elected Fellow of the Canadian Academy of Engineering in 2020. He is a member of several professional organizations, including the Association for the Advancement of Artificial Intelligence, Canadian Academy of Engineers (CAE), Engineering Institute of Canada (EIC), Canadian Society for Civil Engineering (CSCE), Institute of Electrical and Electronics Engineers (IEEE), and Intelligent Transportation Society of Canada (ITS-Canada). He served on the board of directors of the Government of Ontario (GO) Transit Authority from 2004 to 2006.

Early life and education
Abdulhai was born in Cairo, Egypt in 1966. He attended Cairo University, from which he received his Bachelor's and Master's degrees in Civil Engineering in 1988 and 1991, respectively. He then moved to the United States, earning his Doctoral degree in Civil Engineering from the University of California, Irvine in 1996.

Abdulhai has also obtained several professional certificates related to his field, from MIT, Northwestern University, Technical University of Crete, University of Rome and University of Napoli.

Career
Abdulhai began his career in 1998 as a Transportation Research Engineer at Development Research and Technological Planning Centre. Following this, he was appointed by the University of California, Irvine as a Research Assistant in 1993. Between 1997 and 1998, he held a brief appointment as Instructor and Postdoctoral scholar at University of California, Los Angeles, University of Southern California, and the University of California, Berkeley. He then joined the University of Toronto as an Assistant Professor in 1998, was promoted to Associate Professor in 2003, and became Professor of Civil Engineering in 2011. During this time period, he was also twice appointed as Adjunct Professor at McMaster University, and as Canada Research Chair in Intelligent Transportation Systems at the University of Toronto. He has been serving as Director of the Toronto ITS Centre and Testbed since 2000, and as Director of iCity Centre for Automated and Transformative Transportation Systems since 2017. 

Abdulhai was appointed as Director for Greater Toronto Transit Authority till 2006. He has also held appointment as Inaugural President of ONE-ITS Research Society from 2010 to 2014. Currently, he is the CEO and managing director of IntelliCAN Transportation System. 

Abdulhai has supervised over 60 research students, including Hossam Abdelgawad, Samah El-Tantawy, Kasra Rezaee, and Seyed Mohammad Tabib.

Research
Abdulhai has authored numerous publications including scholarly journal articles, magazine Articles, reports, and book chapters. His research works span transportation systems engineering and Intelligent Transportation Systems (ITS), with particular emphasis on artificial intelligence based optimal traffic control, emergency evacuation optimization, dynamic road pricing, and smart cities under automated and transformative transportation systems. He and his team have patented several technologies, including his MARLIN smart traffic lights control software, and a new system—MiND—which considers both traffic and public transit to minimize delays for all users. His research team has also been awarded multiple collaborative grants from NSERC, Huawei Technologies Canada Co, Ministry of Transportation of Ontario, CANARIE, Ministry of Transportation of the Netherlands, and MaRS Innovation.

While focusing on optimal control of heavily congested traffic across a two-dimensional road network, Abdulhai introduced applications of Q-learning as a reinforcement learning algorithm in the context of traffic signal control. In 2013, he explored the development stages and evaluation of a novel system of multiagent reinforcement learning in terms of integrated network of adaptive traffic signal controllers (MARLIN-ATSC). Using Paramics, the microscopic traffic simulation platform, he discussed genetic algorithm-based optimization approach, as well as demonstrated the usage of a generic tool ‘GENOSIM’ for the purpose of calibrating traffic microscopic simulation parameters. He described how genetic algorithms in GENOSIM play a role in manipulating the values of control parameters, and subsequently lead to a search for an optimal set of values that serve to reduce the discrepancy that exists between simulation output and real field data. 

Abdulhai introduced a traffic flow prediction system based on an advanced Time Delay Neural Network (TDNN) model. In his research studies, he provided a detailed analysis of attributes of potentially universal freeway incident detection framework, and highlighted the testing and training procedures of Probabilistic Neural Network (PNN). Using real incident databases from the I-880 freeway in California and the I-35W in Minnesota, he conducted a large-scale study to comparatively evaluate the performance and transferability of different algorithms, including PNN. In 2015, he examined the potential impacts of connected vehicles in terms of improving mobility, reducing greenhouse gas emissions (GHGs), and increasing safety at the network-wide level. 

Abdulhai's study is also focused onto providing practitioners and decision-makers with knowledge related to the potential benefits of AVs with respect to market penetration and fleet conversion. In 2017, he proposed an analytical framework to quantify and evaluate the impacts of AVs on the capacities of highway systems. Using deep reinforcement learning and high dimensional sensory inputs, he performed a case study focused on achieving better performance and faster training times compared to conventional tabular reinforcement learning approaches. He has also investigated the effects of DBLs through a comparison with EBLs and mixed traffic operation under different levels of traffic demand and transit frequency.

Awards and honors 
2001 - Ontario Research and Development Challenge Fund Award
2005 - Bronze Medal, Canadian Government Technology (G-Tech)
2005 - Canada Research Chair in Intelligent Transportation Systems
2005 – Award of Excellence, Canadian Society of Civil Engineers (CSCE) 
2006 – Chair's Silver Award for Excellence in Research 
2006 – IEEE Award of Outstanding Service
2007 – Chair's Bronze Award for Excellence in Research, University of Toronto
2014 – Inventor of the Year, University of Toronto 
2015 – Fellow, Engineering Institute of Canada (EIC) 
2015 – ITS Canada New Canadian Commercial/Industry/Academic Technology Innovation/R&D Award
2018 – Sandford Fleming Award, Canadian Society of Civil Engineers (CSCE) 
2020 – Fellow, The Canadian Academy of Engineering (CAE) 
2021 – Engineering Medal for Engineering Excellence, Ontario Professional Engineers Awards (OPEA)

Bibliography
Abdulhai, B., Pringle, R., & Karakoulas, G. J. (2003). Reinforcement learning for true adaptive traffic signal control. Journal of Transportation Engineering, 129(3).
Abdelgawad, H., & Abdulhai, B. (2010). Managing large-scale multimodal emergency evacuations. Journal of Transportation Safety & Security, 2(2), 122–151.
Kattan, L., & Abdulhai, B. (2012). Sensitivity analysis of an evolutionary-based time-dependent origin/destination estimation framework. IEEE Transactions on Intelligent Transportation Systems, 13(3), 1442–1453.
Rezaee, K., Abdulhai, B., & Abdelgawad, H. (2013). Self-learning adaptive ramp metering: Analysis of design parameters on a test case in Toronto, Canada. Transportation research record, 2396(1), 10–18.
El-Tantawy, S., Abdulhai, B., & Abdelgawad, H. (2013). Multiagent reinforcement learning for integrated network of adaptive traffic signal controllers (MARLIN-ATSC): methodology and large-scale application on downtown Toronto. IEEE Transactions on Intelligent Transportation Systems, 14(3), 1140–1150.
Aboudina, A., & Abdulhai, B. (2017). A bi-level distributed approach for optimizing time-dependent congestion pricing in large networks: A simulation-based case study in the Greater Toronto Area. Transportation Research Part C: Emerging Technologies, 85, 684–710.
Kamel, I., Hasnine, M. S., Shalaby, A., Habib, K. N., & Abdulhai, B. (2021). Integrated framework of departure time choice, mode choice, and route assignment for large-scale networks. Case Studies on Transport Policy, 9(3), 1284–1297.
Shabestary, S. M. A., & Abdulhai, B. (2022). Adaptive traffic signal control with deep reinforcement learning and high dimensional sensory inputs: Case study and comprehensive sensitivity analyses. IEEE Transactions on Intelligent Transportation Systems, 23(11), 20021-20035.
Elmorshedy, L., Abdulhai, B., & Kamel, I. (2022) Comparative Analysis and Quantitative Evaluation of the Impacts of Adaptive Cruise Control Systems on Congested Urban Freeways Using Different Car Following Models and Early Control Results. IEEE Open Journal of Intelligent Transportation Systems, Volume 3, 288–30.
Othman, K., Shalaby, A., & Abdulhai, B. (2022). Dynamic Bus Lanes Versus Exclusive Bus Lanes: Comprehensive Comparative Analysis of Urban Corridor Performance. Transportation Research Record, 03611981221099517.

References 

Living people
1966 births
Canadian civil engineers
Canadian academics